Iris Hellin Sihvonen (née Jokinen; 22 April 1940 – 29 May 2010) was a Finnish speed skater. She represented Finland at the Olympic Winter Games of 1960 in Squaw Valley, Placer County, California and made seven consecutive appearances at the World Allround Speed Skating Championships for Women between 1955 and 1961. She became Finnish champion in 1956 and 1961 and skated at first with Valkeakosken Haka and later with Valkeakosken Koskenpojat.

Personal records

References

Notes

Bibliography

 Eng, Trond. All Time International Championships, Complete Results 1889 - 2002. Askim, Norway: WSSSA Skøytenytt, 2002.
 Eng, Trond. Finland - Suomi: Speedskating as at 2009. Part 1: History/Records/Championships men junior. Askim, Norway: WSSSA Skøytenytt, 2009.
 Eng, Trond. Finland - Suomi: Speedskating as at 2009. Part 3: Championships ladies/Alltime lists ladies distances. Askim, Norway: WSSSA Skøytenytt, 2009.
 Teigen, Magne. Komplette resultater, Internasjonale Mesterskap 1889-1989 (in Norwegian). Veggli, Norway: WSSSA Skøytenytt, 1989.

External links
 

1940 births
2010 deaths
Finnish female speed skaters
Olympic speed skaters of Finland
Speed skaters at the 1960 Winter Olympics
People from Liperi
Sportspeople from North Karelia